Kosher Today is a periodical focused on "foods that are prepared according to kashrut, the dietary regulations of Judaism."

Described as a trade magazine, it is published by Integrated Marketing Communications. By 2017 it had become online-only; which also has a Breaking News section.

Their coverage is not limited to the U.S. market.

Kosherfest

Kosher Today'''s publisher is also "the owner of Kosherfest, a kosher food trade show." Competition in this trade show category include Kosher World Conference and Expo and Kosher Food and Life Expo''.

See also
 Kosher.com

References

Jewish magazines published in the United States
Online magazines with defunct print editions
Magazines disestablished in 2017
Food and drink magazines